Epic Hotel is an urban hotel and residential skyscraper in Downtown Miami, Florida, United States. The tower is located on the north bank of the Miami River in Downtown Miami's Central Business District. It is bordered by Biscayne Boulevard Way on the west, Southeast 2nd Street to the north, the Miami River to the south, and Southeast 5th Avenue to the east. The architect of the complex is Revuelta Vega Leon.

Epic was part of the EPIC Miami Residences and Hotel two-tower residential complex, consisting of the Epic Tower and the Dupont Tower, but the taller of the two, Dupont Tower, was canceled. If it had been built, the Dupont Tower would have stood 609 ft (186 m) tall and contain 60 floors. The Dupont Tower was named after the Alfred I. DuPont Building, a National Historic Building from the 1930s that is also in Miami. In 2014, the  Epic 2 site sold for US$125 million, a record-breaking rate of $100 million per acre.

See also
List of tallest buildings in Miami

Sources

Epic on Emporis

Residential buildings completed in 2008
Residential skyscrapers in Miami
Skyscraper hotels in Miami
2008 establishments in Florida